USCGC Ingham (WPG/WAGC/WHEC-35) is one of only two preserved s. Originally Samuel D. Ingham, she was the fourth cutter to be named for Treasury Secretary Samuel D. Ingham. She was the most decorated vessel in the Coast Guard fleet and was the only cutter to ever be awarded two Presidential Unit Citations.

History 1934–1988
Ingham was built at the Philadelphia Navy Yard. The Treasury Department awarded her contract on 30 January 1934. Ingham was christened by Ms. Katherine Ingham Brush on that date and the new cutter was formally commissioned on 12 September 1936.

Ingham served with distinction during World War II on convoy duty. Protecting ships ferrying vital supplies to Britain, Ingham battled stormy weather, German U-boats, and enemy aircraft. On 15 December 1942, during one crossing, Ingham engaged and sank the enemy submarine U-626. After 1944, Ingham served as an amphibious flagship and she would later take part in three campaigns in the Pacific Theater. Ingham was the last active warship in the US fleet with a U-Boat kill.

Convoys escorted

Post-war service

In August 1966, Ingham rescued lone sailor William Willis off the US eastern seabord, landing him at the Argentia Coast Guard station.

Ingham earned two Presidential Unit Citations for her service in Operation SEA LORDS and Operation SWIFT RAIDER during the Vietnam War on a deployment from 3 August 1968 to 28 February 1969.

On completion of her deployment to Vietnam, Ingham returned to regular Coast Guard duties, serving until 1988, when she was decommissioned.

Museum Ship and Memorial

Acquired by Patriot's Point (located near Charleston, South Carolina) in 1989, Ingham was displayed along with the aircraft carrier , the destroyer , and the submarine  until 20 August 2009.

On 20 August 2009 Ingham was towed to the Coast Guard piers in North Charleston, South Carolina for minor repairs and to await dry docking. She underwent a short dry docking period at Detyen's Shipyard in North Charleston and was then towed to Key West, Florida arriving there on 24 November 2009. She is now a member of Key West Maritime Memorial Museum.

The Commandant of the Coast Guard has declared Ingham the National Memorial to Coast Guardsmen Killed in Action in World War II and Vietnam. These 912 casualties are identified on a memorial plaque on Ingham's quarterdeck.
Ingham was declared a National Historic Landmark in 1992.

Awards

 Presidential Unit Citation – 2 awards
 Coast Guard Unit Commendation - 2 awards with "O" device 
 Coast Guard Meritorious Unit Commendation – 2 awards
 Coast Guard E Ribbon – 3 awards
 China Service Medal
 American Defense Service Medal with "A" device
 American Campaign Medal with one battle star
 European-African-Middle Eastern Campaign Medal with three battle stars
 Asiatic-Pacific Campaign Medal with three battle stars
 World War II Victory Medal
 Navy Occupation Service Medal
 National Defense Service Medal with star
 Vietnam Service Medal with three campaign stars
 Humanitarian Service Medal
 Coast Guard Special Operations Service Ribbon
 Philippine Presidential Unit Citation
 Republic of Vietnam Gallantry Cross Unit Citation
 Philippine Liberation Ribbon with one star
 Republic of Vietnam Campaign Medal

Gallery

References

External links

US Coast Guard Cutter Inham WHEC-35

Treasury-class cutters
World War II patrol vessels of the United States
Ships on the National Register of Historic Places in Florida
Ships built in Philadelphia
1936 ships
National Register of Historic Places in Key West, Florida
National Historic Landmarks in Florida
Ships of the United States Coast Guard
Museums in Key West, Florida
Museum ships in Florida